The Daydream Club is an English multi-genre music duo formed in 2010 by husband and wife Adam and Paula Pickering. They say their one goal is to make music they're proud of. Their manager claims they have built a strong, loyal fan base without traditional forms of financing, promotion or backing. To date all material has been self-released through their own label, Poco Poco Records. They have featured on BBC, Burberry, Acoustic Magazine, Rolling Stone, Level Films, Channel 4, the Hype Machine's most influential music blogs, and Spotify, with over 100 million streams.

History
Adam Pickering began as a session musician, whilst Paula was a professional dancer. The pair first met in January 2005 on a site-specific arts project in a derelict tobacco factory in Liverpool. The project was in conjunction with the Liverpool Institute for Performing Arts (LIPA) where they both studied. Throughout their studies and after graduating they continued to collaborate on various projects and pursued careers in their respective fields. The Consequence of Sound journalist, Tony Hardy, said that "Together, they appear to have found their true milieu in The Daydream Club", which they formed in 2010.

Pickering, a multi-instrumentalist (keys, drums, guitar, bass, percussion, melodica), singer, songwriter and producer, has supported acts such as Sam Sparro, The Wombats, Sneaky Sound System, Tinchy Stryder, DJ Yoda and Felix B from Basement Jaxx.  Walker began her career as a dancer and toured internationally with the percussion show 'Noise Ensemble', headlining Henley Festival and working with Luc Petit (former Director of Cirque Du Soleil).

Releases

Albums

Singles

References

External links
 Website

English musical duos
British indie folk groups
Musical groups established in 2010
Musicians from Leicestershire
People from Redcar
English singer-songwriters
Alumni of the Liverpool Institute for Performing Arts
English multi-instrumentalists
2010 establishments in England